Mahée Paiement (born January 2, 1976 in Saint-Eustache, Quebec) is a Quebec movie and television actress and known for playing several roles in popular Quebec movies and films since 1986.

Background

After a television role in 1982, Paiement started to perform movie roles in 1986 at the age of 10 when she appeared in Bach et Bottine.  During the next 20 years, she appeared in several movies such as Les Boys IV, Les 3 ptit's cochons and popular television series such as Watatatow, Diva, Un gars, une fille, Caméra café, Les Boys (TV series) and Miss Météo (TV series). She also performed theatrical acts from 1992 to 1996 and is also modeling in Sweden.

Filmography

Cinema
 Bach and Broccoli (Bach et Bottine) - 1986
 Death of a Silence - 1987
 A Walk on the Moon - 1999
 Les Boys IV - 2005
 The 3 L'il Pigs (Les 3 p'tits cochons) - 2007
 My Aunt Aline (Ma tante Aline) - 2007
 Brain Freeze - 2021

Television
 Peau de banane (1982)
 Rachel et Rejean (1987)
 L'amour avec un grand A (1988)
 La Saga d'Archibald (1990)
 Watatatow (1990-???)
 Diva (1997)
 Un gars, une fille (1997)
 Caméra café (2002)
 Miss Metéo (2005)
 Les Boys (television series) (2007–2008)
 Miss Météo (television series) (2008)

References

External links
 

1976 births
Canadian film actresses
Canadian television actresses
French Quebecers
Living people
People from Saint-Eustache, Quebec
Actresses from Quebec
Canadian female models